The 2019–20 Oxford United season was the club's 126th year in existence and their fourth consecutive season in League One, the third tier of English football. As well as competing in League One, the club also participated in the FA Cup, EFL Cup and EFL Trophy. The season covered the period from 1 July 2019 to 30 June 2020.

First-team squad

Transfers

Transfers in

Loans in

Loans out

Transfers out

Pre-season

On 10 May 2019, the U's announced their pre-season fixtures. A second home friendly against Fulham was added. Lastly a trip to Scotland to face Rangers was later confirmed.

Competitions

League One

League table

Results summary

Results by matchday

Matches
On Thursday, 20 June 2019, the EFL League One fixtures were released.

Play-offs

FA Cup

The draw for the First Round Proper was held on 21 October 2019. The second round draw was made live on 11 November from Chichester City's stadium, Oaklands Park. The draw for the third round was held on 2 December 2019. The fourth round draw was made by Alex Scott and David O'Leary on Monday, 6 January.

EFL Cup

The first-round draw was made on 20 June. The second-round draw was made on 13 August 2019 following the conclusion of all but one first-round matches. The third round draw was confirmed on 28 August 2019, live on Sky Sports. The draw for the fourth round was made on 25 September 2019. The quarter-final draw was conducted on 31 October, live on BBC Radio 2. After convincingly beating Premier League opponents West Ham in the third round, Oxford were eliminated at the quarter-final stage by eventual winners Manchester City, who had also beaten them in the same competition in an  earlier round the previous season.

EFL Trophy

On 9 July 2019, the pre-determined group stage draw was announced with invited clubs to be drawn on 12 July 2019. The draw for the second round was made on 16 November 2019 live on Sky Sports.

Squad statistics

Appearances and goals

Top scorers

Disciplinary record

References

Oxford United
Oxford United F.C. seasons